Man with a Memory is the second studio album by American country music artist Joe Nichols. It was released on July 23, 2002 by Universal South Records. It produced four singles on the Billboard Hot Country Songs chart: "The Impossible", "Brokenheartsville" (his first Number One), "She Only Smokes When She Drinks" and "Cool to Be a Fool". It is certified platinum by the RIAA as shipping one million copies in the United States and received a Grammy nomination for Best Country Album.

The album is the first production credit for session guitarist Brent Rowan.

"Everything's a Thing" was originally recorded by Craig Morgan on his 2000 self-titled debut album. "Life Don't Have to Mean Nothing at All" was recorded by Tom T. Hall on his 1997 album "Home Grown".

Track listing

Personnel
Vinnie Colaiuta - drums
Eric Darken - percussion
Jerry Douglas - dobro
Dan Dugmore - steel guitar
Shannon Forrest - drums
Vince Gill - background vocals
Aubrey Haynie - fiddle
Wes Hightower - background vocals
John Hughey - steel guitar
David Hungate - bass guitar
Shane Keister - Wurlitzer
Tim Lauer - accordion, Fender Rhodes, harmonium, keyboards, mellotron, organ, Wurlitzer 
Liana Manis - background vocals
Gordon Mote - piano
Joe Nichols - lead vocals, background vocals
Brent Rowan - acoustic guitar, baritone guitar, electric guitar, gut string guitar, hi-string guitar, tiple, background vocals
Harry Stinson - background vocals
Bryan Sutton - banjo, acoustic guitar, electric guitar, mandolin, national duolian
Chris Thile - mandolin
Tommy White - steel guitar

Charts

Weekly charts

Year-end charts

Singles

Certifications

References

2002 albums
Joe Nichols albums
Show Dog-Universal Music albums
Albums produced by Brent Rowan